Yuliya Pyryseva (born 22 December 1967) is a Russian-born Kazakhstani water polo player. She competed in the women's tournament at the 2000 Summer Olympics.

References

External links
 

1967 births
Living people
People from Miass
Russian emigrants to Kazakhstan
Soviet female water polo players
Russian female water polo players
Kazakhstani female water polo players
Olympic water polo players of Kazakhstan
Water polo players at the 2000 Summer Olympics
Sportspeople from Chelyabinsk Oblast